David Hyman (October 17, 1971) is an American entrepreneur. He is the co-founder and CEO of Unagi Scooters, a manufacturer of electric scooters, which launched December 2018. Hyman is also the former CEO of Beats Music, MOG, Gracenote and Blin.gy.

Early life and background
Hyman was born and raised in Melville, New York. The son of Martin and Diane Hyman, he is the youngest of three siblings. His father Martin Hyman was Executive Vice President of Milgray Electronics. Hyman was educated on Long Island, graduating in 1985. He attended the University of Vermont from 1985 to 1989 and holds a bachelor's degree in Economics.

Career

Wired Magazine / Hotwired
Hyman started his online career in online advertising sales at Wired Digital in San Francisco, California, where he was an active participant in the web's constructs of online advertising. While at Wired Digital he sold one of the first advertisements online and also created the first platform for pioneering e-commerce entities to advertise.

Sonicnet
From 1996 to 1999 Hyman worked as the Senior Vice President of Sales and Marketing at Sonicnet. From 1999 to mid-2000 he worked at MTV Interactive as the Senior Vice President of Marketing, where he oversaw all marketing functions for MTV.com, VH1.com, Nickelodeon.com, and Sonicnet. A little known fact is that Hyman was the voice-over announcer on the only television ads done in MTVi's and Sonicnet's history.

Gracenote
In 2000 Hyman created Gracenote and was its original President and CEO. There, he took fledgling compact disc identification technology (CDDB) and turned it into the world's largest music identification and music management company. Hyman's efforts helped to drive Gracenote to become core plumbing for all MP3 players & encoders in hardware and software. Gracenote was sold to Sony for $260 million in 2008.

MOG
In 2005 Hyman founded MOG in Berkeley, California.

Beats Music
In 2012, Hyman was CEO of Beats Music, the music subscription service created as an offshoot to Beats By Dre. Beats Music was subsequently sold to Apple along with Beats By Dre for $3 billion.

Blin.gy
In 2016 Hyman developed Blin.gy, the first augmented-reality mobile application enabling video segmentation, allowing anyone to superimpose their own video or image into any video simply using their built-in mobile phone camera. There, he oversaw the development of a proprietary lightweight neural network to run on a mobile GPU with an inference engine trained to identify and separate humans from their background environments.

Blin.gy closed its operations in September 2017. Hyman wrote a eulogy to the company.

Unagi Scooters
In November 2018, Hyman launched Unagi Scooters on Kickstarter, generating $240,000 in revenue. Unagi has been praised as the leading portable electric scooter by numerous publications including The Verge, Gizmodo, and Endgadget.

Personal
Hyman holds three patents: one in automatic meta-data sharing of existing media through social networking (US 7685132 B2), another in automatic meta-data sharing of existing media (US 7979442 B2), and a third in multiple-step identification of recordings (US 8468357 B2).

He is a frequent speaker at conferences such as SXSW, CES and Midem. In 2008, he founded Musica Tecnomica, a regular gathering of music-focused innovators in San Francisco.

See also

 Gracenote
 MOG (online music)

External links
Gracenote
Mog
Chosen

References

1967 births
Living people
American businesspeople
People from Suffolk County, New York
University of Vermont alumni